Batton Story (literally The road employees) is a 1976 commedia sexy all'italiana directed by Mario Landi.

Synopsis

A Roman teacher takes the side of a group of prostitutes and sets up a trade union to support their rights.

Cast 

 Femi Benussi as Marisa Colli
 Marisa Merlini as  Zaira
 Daniela Giordano as  Pucci
 Gianni Dei as  Stefano
 Toni Ucci as  Carlo
 Gianni Cajafa as  Arturo 
 Mariangela Giordano as  Priscilla

See also 
 
 List of Italian films of 1976

References

External links
 

1976 films
1970s Italian-language films
1970s sex comedy films
Commedia sexy all'italiana
Films directed by Mario Landi
Films about prostitution in Italy
1976 comedy films
1970s Italian films